Strato I Dikaios (Greek: ,  “the Good”) also known as Stratha in Sanskrit, was a Yavana King (reigned 125/120-110 BCE), the son and successor of Menander, Strato’s mother, Agathoclea ruled as Queen Mother and regnant for Strato until 120 BCE, when he was of age to succeed his father. He was dynastically succeeded by his son, Menander II.

Date and genealogy

Until recently, consensus was that he ruled between c. 130–110 BCE in Northern India and that his father was the great king Menander I. Menander ruled the entire Indo-Greek empire, but in this scenario, the western parts including Paropamisade and Arachosia gained independence after the death of Menander I, pushing Strato and Agathokleia eastwards to Gandhara and Punjab. This view was introduced by Tarn and defended as recently as 1998 by Bopearachchi.

The modern view, embraced by R. C. Senior and probably more solid since it is founded on numismatical analyses, suggests that Strato I was a later king, perhaps ruling from 110–85 BCE, though perhaps still a descendant of Agathokleia. In this case, Agathokleia was the widow of another king, possibly Nicias or Theophilus.

A third hypothesis was presented in 2007 by J. Jakobsson: according to this, the coins of Strato in fact belong to two kings who both may have ruled around 105–80 BCE, though in different territories: 
 Strato Soter and Dikaios (Greek: ΣΤΡΑΤΩΝ Ο ΣΩΤΗΡ ΚΑΙ ΔΙΚΑΙΟΣ "Strato the saviour and just/righteous"), was Agathokleia's son.
 Strato Epiphanes Soter (Greek: ΣΤΡΑΤΩΝ Ο ΕΠΙΦΑΝΗΣ ΣΩΤΗΡ "Strato the illustrious, saviour"), was a middle-aged king who may have been Agathokleia's brother and ruled in western Punjab.
This theory was based on difference in titles, in monograms and coin types between the two.

Events during his reign

Agathocleia's importance was gradually downplayed on the coins, so presumably her guardianship ended when Strato came of age. Strato I was also the only Indo-Greek king to appear bearded, probably to indicate that he was no longer an infant. Strato I, or the two Stratos, fought for hegemony in Punjab with the king Heliokles II, who overstruck several of their coins. There were very likely wars with other kings as well. The middle-aged Strato, according to the third theory, was succeeded by his son Polyxenios, who ruled only for a short time. 
 
A hoard of Strato's coins was found in Mathura outside New Delhi, which may have been the easternmost outpost of the Indo-Greek territory.

Coins

The coins of Strato show portraits aging from a youth to middle-aged. They have been divided into the following periods, where period 8 may belong to the second king. 

 Period 1 (Only Agathokleia):
Bronzes: Athena / seated Heracles.
Obverse - Greek: ΒΑΣΙΛΙΣΣΗΣ ΘΕΟΤΡΟΠΟΥ ΑΓΑΘΟΚΛΕΙΑΣ "of queen Godlike Agathokleia"
Reverse - Pali: Maharajasa tratarasa dhramikasa Agathukriae "Queen Agathokleia, saviour and follower of the dharma" 
 Period 2:
Silver: Agathokleia's portrait / walking king forming benediction gesture.
Obverse - Greek: ΒΑΣΙΛΙΣΣΗΣ ΑΓΑΘΟΚΛΕΙΑΣ "of queen Agathokleia"
Reverse - Pali: Maharajasa tratarasa dhramikasa Stratasa "The Great king Strato, saviour and followers of the Dharma" 
 Period 3:
Silver: Bust of adolescent Strato / Athena holding Nike.
Obverse - Greek: ΒΑΣΙΛΕΩΣ ΣΩΤΗΡΟΣ ΚΑΙ ΔΙΚΑΙΟΥ ΣΤΡΑΤΩΝΟΣ "of king saviour and just/righteous Strato"
Reverse - Pali: Maharajasa tratarasa Dhramikasa Stratasa "Great saviour king Strato, follower of the Dharma" 
 Period 4:
Silver: Adolescent Strato jointly with Agathokleia / Athena Alkidemos left.
Obverse - Greek: ΒΑΣΙΛΕΩΣ ΣΩΤΗΡΟΣ ΣΤΡΑΤΩΝΟΣ ΚΑΙ ΑΓΑΘΟΚΛΕΙΑΣ "of king saviour Strato, and Agathokleia"
Reverse - Pali: Maharajasa tratarasa Stratasa/Agathukriae "Great saviour king Strato, and Agathokleia" 
 Period 5-7:
Silver: Strato alone, diademed, helmeted or spear-throwing, sometimes bearded / Athena Alkidemos (left, right or forward).
Bronzes: Heracles / Nike
Obverse - (5-6) Greek: ΒΑΣΙΛΕΩΣ ΣΩΤΗΡΟΣ ΣΤΡΑΤΩΝΟΣ "of king saviour Strato"
(7)   Greek: ΒΑΣΙΛΕΩΣ ΣΩΤΗΡΟΣ ΔΙΚΑΙΟΥ ΣΤΡΑΤΩΝΟΣ "of king saviour and Just/Righteous Strato"
Reverse - (5)   Pali: Maharajasa tratarasa Stratasa "Great saviour king Strato" 
(6)   Pali: Maharajasa tratarasa dhramikasa Stratasa "Great saviour king Strato, follower of the dharma"
(7)   Pali: Maharajasa tratarasa dhramikasa Stratasa "Great saviour king Strato, follower of the dharma"
 Period 8:
Silver: Middle-aged Strato diademed or helmeted / Athena Alkidemos left.
Bronzes: Apollo / Sacrificial tripod
Obverse - Greek: ΒΑΣΙΛΕΩΣ ΕΠΙΦΑΝΟΥΣ ΣΩΤΗΡΟΣ ΣΤΡΑΤΩΝΟΣ "of king illustrious saviour Strato"
Reverse - Pali: Maharajasa pracachasa tratarasa Stratasa "Great saviour king Strato, the illustrious"

See also
 Greco-Buddhism
 Indo-Scythians

Notes

References
 The Greeks in Bactria and India, W.W. Tarn, Cambridge University Press

External links
Coins of Strato I
More coins of Strato I

Indo-Greek kings
2nd-century BC rulers in Asia
Euthydemid dynasty